Paraskevi Plexida (born ) was a Greek group rhythmic gymnast. She represents her nation at international competitions. 

She participated at the 2008 Summer Olympics in Beijing. She also competed at world championships, including at the 2007  World Rhythmic Gymnastics Championships.

References

External links

https://database.fig-gymnastics.com/public/gymnasts/biography/6447/true?backUrl=%2Fpublic%2Fresults%2Fdisplay%2F544%3FidAgeCategory%3D8%26idCategory%3D78%23anchor_41833
http://chimgym.blogspot.de/2008/06/gymnasts-at-beijing-olympics.html
http://library.la84.org/6oic/OfficialReports/2008/2008Results_Book3.pdf
http://www.ueg.org/files/page/editor/files/2008_Results_ECh_RG%20Torino%20ITA(1).pdf

1991 births
Living people
Greek rhythmic gymnasts
Place of birth missing (living people)
Gymnasts at the 2008 Summer Olympics
Olympic gymnasts of Greece